Derbyshire Children's Hospital is a children's hospital in Derby, Derbyshire in the United Kingdom. It is managed by the University Hospitals of Derby and Burton NHS Foundation Trust. It was the only entirely new children's hospital built in the UK in the twentieth century.

History 
The hospital was established as the Derbyshire Hospital for Sick Children in a Victorian building on North Street in 1877. It joined the National Health Service in 1948 and moved to a modern building on the Royal Derby Hospital site in 1996. It was the only entirely new children's hospital built in the UK in the twentieth century. The reception area's unique decoration and complex floor design were based on a cartoon seaside theme.

See also
 List of hospitals in England

References

 

 

Hospital buildings completed in 1996
Children's hospitals in the United Kingdom
Hospitals in Derby
NHS hospitals in England